Complete list of  Telugu films produced by the Tollywood film industry based in Madras  & Hyderabad in the year 1957. Movies released 35

1957
Telugu
Telugu films